Alberto Gallego may refer to:
Alberto Gallego (footballer) (born 1974), Spanish football manager and former footballer
Alberto Gallego (cyclist) (born 1990), Spanish cyclist